Jerry Eckwood (born December 26, 1954) is a former NFL running back.  He played for the Tampa Bay Buccaneers from 1979–1981, and was a key member of the Buccaneers team that made the first playoff appearance in franchise history in 1979.  Eckwood played collegiately for the Arkansas Razorbacks from 1975–78.

High school career 
Eckwood was a highly recruited running back out of Brinkley, Arkansas, rushing for 2616 yards in 1973.  He was signed to an athletic scholarship with the Arkansas Razorbacks by then-head coach Frank Broyles.

Collegiate career 
Eckwood played for the Razorbacks from 1975–78, and was a three-year letterman ('75, '76, '78), playing both for Broyles and Lou Holtz.  Eckwood was named 1st Team All Southwest Conference in 1975, rushing for 792 yards on 104 carries.  His 7.62 yards per carry that season remained a school record until it was broken by Felix Jones in 2007.  Eckwood had six 100-yard rushing games in his Razorback career, five of those games occurring in 1975.

NFL career

1979 Season
Eckwood was taken in the third round of the 1979 NFL Draft by the Tampa Bay Buccaneers, ahead of notable players such as Pro Football Hall of Famer Joe Montana and Pro Bowlers Kenny King, William Andrews, and Tony Franklin. Eckwood shared the backfield with quarterback Doug Williams and running back Ricky Bell.   In 1979, Eckwood was the Buccaneers' second- leading rusher with 690 yards on 194 carries. He was, at the time, one of only 11 running backs to have gained 100 yards in his first professional game. Tampa Bay made the first playoff appearance in franchise history in 1979, advancing to the NFC Championship Game, where they lost to the Los Angeles Rams 9-0.  Eckwood's 42-yard option pass to Larry Mucker was the Bucs' longest play of the game.

1980 Season
In 1980, Eckwood was again second in rushing with 504 yards, and was also second on the team with 47 receptions. He fell into some disfavor during this season, after fumbling at key points of four of the team's losses.

1981 Season
In 1981, Eckwood led the Buccaneers in rushing with 651 yards on 172 carries (3.8 avg.).  In Eckwood's final NFL season, Tampa Bay finished with a 9-7 record, losing in the first round of the 1981 NFL playoffs to the Dallas Cowboys.  Eckwood rushed 515 times for 1845 yards (3.6 avg.) and six touchdowns in his 3-year NFL career and was the starter in 30 of the 47 games he played in, all with the Buccaneers.  He also caught 93 passes for 956 yards (10.3 avg.) and one touchdown.

Post-career

Legacy
Eckwood was selected the 79th greatest player in Buccaneer history in 2007.  Eckwood's nephew, LaDarius Eckwood is a wide receiver who played football with the University of Arkansas-Pine Bluff Golden Lions after catching 108 passes in the 2008 season for Springdale High School.

Concussion issues
Eckwood suffered several concussions while playing in college and in the NFL. Since leaving the NFL, Eckwood has struggled with mental illness, and was committed to the Arkansas State Hospital  for several years. He currently suffers from dementia, and is housed in an assisted living facility. Former Buccaneers president Gay Culverhouse has assisted with his medical care and has cited him as an example of the mistreatment NFL players receive from their employers.  Culverhouse recalled warning signs of Eckwood's future mental problems, citing times where he went to the wrong huddle or bench during games. Eckwood, who can no longer drive or live on his own, was approved to participate in the 88 Plan, an NFL program for former players suffering from various dementia-related symptoms, such as hallucinations, forgetfulness, paranoia, and the inability to process new information. Eckwood was also approved by the NFL to receive annual benefits of $136,000 for the remainder of his life.

See also
 Arkansas Razorbacks football
 Lou Holtz
 Tampa Bay Buccaneers
 Concussions in American football

References

External links
 NFL Player Care Foundation

1954 births
American football running backs
Arkansas Razorbacks football players
Tampa Bay Buccaneers players
Living people
People from Brinkley, Arkansas